Andrea Valentina del Rosario López Urroz (born 10 February 1995), known as Andrea Urroz, is a Nicaraguan footballer who plays as a midfielder for the Nicaragua women's national team.

Club career
Urroz has played for Saúl Álvarez in Nicaragua.

International career
Urroz capped for Nicaragua at senior level during the 2013 Central American Games, the 2014 Central American and Caribbean Games and the 2018 CONCACAF Women's Championship qualification.

References 

1995 births
Living people
Nicaraguan women's footballers
Women's association football midfielders
Nicaragua women's international footballers
Central American Games silver medalists for Nicaragua
Central American Games medalists in football